High Melton is a civil parish in the metropolitan borough of Doncaster, South Yorkshire, England.  The parish contains eight listed buildings that are recorded in the National Heritage List for England.  Of these, one is listed at Grade II*, the middle of the three grades, and the others are at Grade II, the lowest grade.  The parish contains the village of High Melton and the surrounding area.  All the listed buildings are in the village, and consist of a church, a country house later used for other purposes, houses, cottages, farmhouses, a former village hall, and a milestone.


Key

Buildings

References

Citations

Sources

 

Lists of listed buildings in South Yorkshire
Buildings and structures in the Metropolitan Borough of Doncaster